Henry Wirz (born Hartmann Heinrich Wirz, November 25, 1823 – November 10, 1865) was a Swiss-American officer of the Confederate States Army during the American Civil War. He was the commandant of the stockade of Camp Sumter, a Confederate prisoner-of-war camp near Andersonville, Georgia, where nearly 13,000 Union detainees died as result of inhumane conditions. After the war, Wirz was tried and executed for conspiracy and murder relating to his command of the camp.

Since his execution, Wirz has become a controversial figure due to debate about his guilt and reputation, including criticism over his personal responsibility for Camp Sumter's conditions and the quality of his post-war trial.

Early life and career
Wirz was born Hartmann Heinrich Wirz on November 25, 1823, in Zürich, Switzerland, to Johann Caspar Wirz, a master tailor and member of Zürich's city council, and Sophie Barbara Philipp. Wirz received elementary and secondary education, and he aspired to become a physician but his family did not possess funds to pay for his medical education. Instead, he was educated as a merchant in Zürich and Turin from 1840 until 1842, when he began working at the department store of Zürich. He married Emilie Oschwald in 1845 and had two children.

In 1847, Wirz was sentenced to four years in prison on charges of embezzlement and fraud. He was released the next year and his sentence was commuted to 12 years of exile from the canton of Zürich, but his wife refused to emigrate and obtained a divorce in 1853. Wirz first went to Moscow, in 1848, and the next year to the United States, where he found employment in a factory in Lawrence, Massachusetts. After five years, he moved to Hopkinsville, Kentucky, and worked as a doctor's assistant. There, he learned to perform small surgeries and cast fractures. He tried to establish his own homeopathic medicine practice in Cadiz, Kentucky, and also worked as superintendent of a water cure clinic in Northampton, Massachusetts.

In 1854, Wirz married the Methodist widow Elizabeth Wolfe (née Savells). Along with her two daughters, they moved to Louisiana, where Wolfe gave birth to their daughter. In 1856 Wirz made the acquaintance of Levin R. Marshall, the owner of the plantation Cabin Teele, who employed him as its overseer and where he set up a practice for homeopathic medicine.

Civil War
Upon the outbreak of the American Civil War in 1861, 37 year-old Wirz enlisted as a private in Company A (Madison Infantry), 4th Battalion of Louisiana Infantry of the Confederate army in Madison Parish. 
Shortly before his death, he said that he had taken part in the Battle of Seven Pines in May 1862, as an aide-de-camp to General Joseph E. Johnston, during which he was wounded by a Minie ball and lost the use of his right arm. That account is disputed by historians, one of whom says the injury may have actually occurred during a six-thousand mile mission to track down missing records of Union prisoners. That journey and a subsequent three months of rehabilitation at his home, were completed by the end of 1862.

After returning to his unit on June 12, 1862, Wirz was promoted to captain "for bravery on the field of battle." Because of his injury, Wirz was assigned to the staff of General John H. Winder, who was in charge of Confederate prisoner-of-war camps, as his adjutant.

Later accounts by Wirz's daughter alleged that Confederate President Jefferson Davis made Captain Wirz a “special minister” and sent him to Europe carrying secret dispatches to Confederate Commissioners James Mason in England, and John Slidell in France. Wirz returned from Europe in January 1864 and reported to Richmond, Virginia, where he began working for General Winder in the prison department. Wirz initially served on detached duty as a prison commandant in Alabama, but was then transferred to help guard Union prisoners incarcerated at Richmond.

Camp Sumter

In February 1864, the Confederate government established Camp Sumter, a large military prison near the small railroad depot of Anderson (now Andersonville) in south-western Georgia, built to house Union prisoners-of-war. In April 1864, Wirz arrived at Camp Sumter and remained there for over a year holding the post of commandant of the stockade and its interior. Wirz was praised by his many superiors and even by some prisoners, and was even recommended for, but not promoted to, major.

Camp Sumter had not been constructed to its full plan, and was quickly overwhelmed by the influx of Union prisoners. Though wooden barracks were originally planned, the Confederates incarcerated the prisoners in a vast, rectangular, open-air stockade originally encompassing , which had been intended as only a temporary prison pending exchanges of prisoners with the Union. The prisoners gave this place the name "Andersonville", which became the colloquial name for the camp. Camp Sumter suffered from severe overcrowding, poor sanitary conditions, an extreme lack of food, tools, medical supplies, and potable water. Wirz recognized that the conditions were inadequate and petitioned his superiors to provide more support, but was denied. In July 1864, he sent five prisoners to the Union with a petition written by the inmates asking the government to negotiate their release.

At its peak in August 1864, Camp Sumter held approximately 32,000 Union prisoners, technically making it the fifth-largest city in the Confederacy. The monthly mortality rate from disease, dysentery, and malnutrition reached 3,000. Around 45,000 prisoners were incarcerated during the camp's 14-month existence, of whom close to 13,000 (28%) died.

Trial and execution

Wirz was arrested by a contingent of the 4th U.S. Cavalry on May 7, 1865, in Andersonville. He was taken first to Macon, Georgia, and then by rail to Washington, D.C., arriving there on May 10, 1865, where he was held in the Old Capitol Prison since the federal government decided to put him on trial for conspiring to impair the lives of Union prisoners of war. A special military commission was convened with Maj. Gen. Lew Wallace presiding. The other members were Gershom Mott; John W. Geary; Lorenzo Thomas; Francis Fessenden; Edward S. Bragg; John F. Ballier, U.S. Volunteers; T. Allcock, 4th New York Artillery; and John H. Stibbs, 12th Iowa Volunteers. Col. Norton P. Chipman served as Judge Advocate. During the trial gangrene prevented Wirz from sitting and he spent the trial on a couch.

Charges
The military tribunal took place between August 23 and October 18, 1865, held in the United States Court of Claims, and dominated the front pages of newspapers across the United States. Wirz was charged with "combining, confederating, and conspiring, together with John H. Winder, Richard B. Winder, Joseph [Isaiah H.] White, W. S. Winder, R. R. Stevenson, and others unknown, to injure the health and destroy the lives of soldiers in the military service of the United States, then held and being prisoners of war within the lines of the so-called Confederate States, and in the military prisons thereof, to the end that the armies of the United States might be weakened and impaired, in violation of the laws and customs of war" and for "violation of the laws of war, to impair and injure the health and to destroy the lives—by subjecting to torture and great suffering; by confining in unhealthy and unwholesome quarters; by exposing to the inclemency of winter and to the dews and burning sun of summer; by compelling the use of impure water; and by furnishing insufficient and unwholesome food—of large numbers of Federal prisoners." Wirz was accused of committing 13 acts of personal cruelty and murders in August 1864: by revolver (specifications 1, 3, 4), by physically stomping and kicking the victim (specification 2), by confining prisoners in stocks (specifications 5, 6), by beating a prisoner with a revolver (specification 13) and by chaining prisoners together (specification 7). Wirz was also charged with ordering guards to fire on prisoners with muskets (specifications 8, 9, 10, 12) and to have dogs attack a prisoner (specification 11).

Testimonies
The National Park Service lists 158 witnesses who testified at the trial, including former Camp Sumter prisoners, ex-Confederate soldiers, and residents of nearby Andersonville. According to Benjamin G. Cloyd, 145 testified that they did not observe Wirz kill any prisoners; others failed to identify specific victims. Twelve said that they witnessed cruelty on the part of Wirz. One witness, Felix de la Baume, who claimed to be a descendant of the Marquis de Lafayette, identified under oath a victim allegedly killed personally by Wirz. Among those giving testimony was Father Peter Whelan, a Catholic priest who worked with the inmates, who testified on Wirz's behalf.

Verdict
In early November 1865, the Military Commission found Wirz guilty of conspiracy as charged, along with 10 of 13 specifications of acts of personal cruelty, and sentenced him to death. He was acquitted of specifications 4, 10, and 13.

In his report on the trial, the Judge Advocate General Joseph Holt, who had prosecuted the Lincoln assassination trials, vilified Wirz and pronounced that, "his work of death seems to have been a saturnalia of enjoyment for the prisoner [Wirz], who amid these savage orgies evidenced such exultation and mingled with them such nameless blasphemy and ribald jest, as at times to exhibit him rather as a demon than a man."

In a letter to U.S. President Andrew Johnson, Wirz asked for clemency, but the letter went unanswered. The night before his execution, Louis F. Schade, an attorney working on behalf of Wirz, was told by an emissary from a high Cabinet official that if Wirz implicated Jefferson Davis in the atrocities committed at Andersonville, his sentence would be commuted. Allegedly, Schade repeated the offer to Wirz who replied, "Mr. Schade, you know that I have always told you that I do not know anything about Jefferson Davis. He had no connection with me as to what was done at Andersonville. If I knew anything of him, I would not become a traitor against him, or anybody else, even to save my life." Rev. P. E. Bole received the same visitor and later sent a letter to Jefferson Davis, who included it as well as Wirz's reply to Schade in his book, Andersonville and Other War-Prisons (1890). Andersonville quartermaster Richard B. Winder, who was in the prison at the time, also confirmed this episode.

Execution

Wirz was hanged at 10:32 a.m. on November 10, 1865, at the Old Capitol Prison in Washington D.C., located next to the U.S. Capitol. His neck did not break from the fall, and the crowd of 200 spectators guarded by 120 soldiers watched as he writhed and slowly strangled. Wirz was buried in the Mount Olivet Cemetery in Washington, D.C.

Wirz was one of only two men tried, convicted, and executed for war crimes during the Civil War, the other being Confederate guerrilla Champ Ferguson. Confederate soldiers Robert Cobb Kennedy, Sam Davis, and John Yates Beall were executed for spying, and Marcellus Jerome Clarke and Henry C. Magruder were executed for being guerrillas.

In 1869, Schade received permission from President Johnson to rebury Wirz's body, which had been buried at the Washington Arsenal alongside the Lincoln assassins. While the body was being transferred, it was discovered that the right arm, and parts of the neck and head, had been removed during autopsy. As of the late 1990s, the National Museum of Health and Medicine still had two of his vertebrae.

Controversy

The Wirz controversy grew out of the questions remaining after his trial pertaining to guilt and responsibility for multiple deaths of prisoners of war in camps on both sides following suspension of the Dix-Hill Cartel prisoner exchange agreement in July 1863.

The Grand Army of the Republic, the United Confederate Veterans, Sons of Confederate Veterans (SCV), and the United Daughters of the Confederacy (UDC), among others, evoked sad memories of Civil War prisoners portraying Wirz either a villain, or a martyr-hero, thus further contributing to the disputation. From 1899 to 1916, sixteen states erected monuments dedicated to the Camp Sumter's prisoners. In response, the United Daughters of the Confederacy initiated a construction of a monument honoring Henry Wirz in Andersonville, Georgia. Every year the UDC and SCV hold a memorial service at the monument.  Until recently, SCV  annually marched to Wirz's memorial in Andersonville along with supporters of a congressional pardon for him. The SCV posthumously awarded Wirz their Confederate Medal of Honor, created in 1977.

During and after the trial Wirz was reviled in the court of public opinion as "The Demon of Andersonville". One controversy concerns a witness for the prosecution, Felix de la Baume, who was actually Felix Oesser, a deserter from the 7th New York Volunteers (Steuben) regiment. According to the National Park Service, de la Baume was definitely a prisoner at Andersonville and it is a myth that he was a key witness at the trial.

After time passed, some writers suggested Wirz's tribunal was unfair and claimed that "Wirz did not receive a fair trial. Nevertheless, he was found guilty and sentenced to death." Even a few of his former prisoners conceded during the trial that the minimal support Wirz received from the Confederate government in terms of food, water, and medical supplies made the conditions at Andersonville beyond his scope of responsibility. In 1980, historian Morgan D. Peoples referred to Wirz as a "scapegoat." Wirz's conviction remains controversial.

Despite the surrounding controversy, the Wirz trial was one of the nation's significant early war crimes tribunals, creating enduring moral and legal notions and established the precedent that certain wartime behavior is unacceptable, regardless if committed under the orders of superiors or on one's own.

In popular culture
Wirz is an important character in MacKinlay Kantor's Pulitzer Prize-winning novel Andersonville (1955), introduced in the third chapter during his mission to France in October 1863.  In Saul Levitt's 1959 play The Andersonville Trial, Wirz was first played by Herbert Berghof. When the play was recreated for an episode of PBS's 1970–71 season of Hollywood Television Theatre, Wirz was portrayed by Richard Basehart. Wirz was portrayed by the Czech actor Jan Tříska in the American film Andersonville (1996).

See also

Libby Prison – another infamous Confederate Civil War prison
Camp Douglas, sometimes described as "The North's Andersonville"
Tokyo Trials
Concentration Camps

Footnotes

References

External links

Entries from Wirz's diary made days before his execution
Henry Wirz biography
Documents suggesting Wirz's innocence
Trial of Captain Henry Wirz, a class assignment for The Seminar in Famous Trials course at the University of Missouri-K.C. School of Law.

1823 births
1865 deaths
19th-century executions by the United States
19th-century executions of American people
American mass murderers
American people convicted of war crimes
American people of Swiss-German descent
Burials at Mount Olivet Cemetery (Washington, D.C.)
Confederate States Army officers
Confederate States Army personnel who were court-martialed
Executed military personnel
Foreign Confederate military personnel
Georgia (U.S. state) in the American Civil War
People executed by the United States military by hanging
People executed for war crimes
Military personnel from Zürich
Swiss emigrants to the United States
Swiss people executed abroad
Swiss mass murderers
People convicted of embezzlement
People convicted of fraud
Executed mass murderers